Wathiq Naji (1 July 1940 – 20 November 2014) ) was an Iraqi football manager, who took the team to the 1986 edition of the FIFA World Cup, their first and only appearance in the competition.

Wathiq died on 20 November 2014 at the age of 74 from a heart attack in Canada.

References

New Straits Times 
New Straits Times 
The North European Rec. Sport Soccer Statistics Foundation (RSSSF) 
The official website of the Indian Football 
The North European Rec. Sport Soccer Statistics Foundation (RSSSF) 
Iraq sport website 
Iraq Football website 
New Sabah Times 
New Sabah Times 
Malay Mail Newspaper 
New Sabah Times

External links
The National & International Iraqi Information of Soccer 
Lebanese football Website 
Lebanese football Website 
The North European Rec. Sport Soccer Statistics Foundation (RSSSF) 
Al-Akhbar Newspaper 
Assafir Newspaper 

1940 births
2014 deaths
Iraqi footballers
Iraqi football managers
Iraqi expatriate football managers
Iraq national football team managers
Iraqi expatriates in Bahrain
Iraqi expatriate sportspeople in Malaysia
Sportspeople from Baghdad
Expatriate football managers in Malaysia
Expatriate football managers in Bahrain
Sabah F.C. (Malaysia) managers
Al-Shorta SC managers
Association football midfielders
Expatriate football managers in Lebanon
Lebanese Premier League managers
Nejmeh SC managers
Al-Zawraa SC managers
Kuala Lumpur City F.C. managers